Joe Smith was an American Negro league pitcher in the 1910s. 

Smith played for the St. Louis Giants in 1913 and again in 1915. In five recorded career appearances on the mound, Smith posted a 4.03 ERA over 38 innings.

References

External links
Baseball statistics and player information from Baseball-Reference Black Baseball Stats and Seamheads 

Year of birth missing
Year of death missing
Place of birth missing
Place of death missing
St. Louis Giants players
Baseball pitchers